Jesus Patracis "Charlie" Cueller (September 24, 1917 – October 11, 1994) was a pitcher in Major League Baseball. He played for the Chicago White Sox in 1950.

References

External links

1917 births
1994 deaths
Major League Baseball pitchers
Chicago White Sox players
Baseball players from Florida
Nashville Vols players